The Battle of Sceaux was a battle in the Franco-Prussian War, which took place on October 13, 1870. In this battle, the German army under the command of General Jakob von Hartmann repelled the French army 's siege when Paris was under German siege, causing the French army heavy losses. Several other French breakthroughs in late 1870 were also broken by the Germans.

The Battle
Two weeks after being repulsed at the Battle of Chevilly , French general Joseph Vinoy again conducted an expedition south of Paris. After a heavy artillery bombardment from the forts to the south, Vinoy sent three vertical formations towards the Clamart heights. General Von Hartmann of Germany implemented a strategy to let the enemy go too far, so that his army would surround the enemy and push them into the range of German artillery and infantry. At the beginning of the attack, the French defeated the outposts of the II corps from Châtillon and Sceaux. However, the German army had already positioned its reserve force behind the fortress of Montrouge, which would be used once the French had captured the heights at Châtillon and the Bavarian artillery positions. After a battle that lasted for about 6 hours (including the participation of the 8th and then 7th Bavarian brigade ), the German crossfire forced the French to run away. As during the French defeat at Châtillon, the French artillery on Mount Valérien made it difficult for the Bavarians to counterattack.

The next major breakout of the French army would be the Battle of Buzenval on the last month October 21, 1870, the German army would defeat the French again.

References

1870 in France
Sceaux
Sceaux
Sceaux
Sceaux
October 1870 events